Statistics of Emperor's Cup in the 1976 season.

Overview
It was contested by 26 teams, and Furukawa Electric won the championship.

Results

1st round
Fukuoka University 2–1 Tanabe Pharmaceuticals
Nippon Kokan 1–3 Yomiuri
Teijin Matsuyama 0–4 Toyo Industries
Yamaguchi Teachers 0–2 Kyoto Shiko
Nihon University 0–2 Yamaha Motors
Chuo University 2–0 Gonohe Town Hall
Yanmar Club 2–1 Honda
Fujita Industries 5–0 Dainichi Cable Industries
Niigata Eleven 1–4 Toyota Motors
Sapporo University 0–6 Waseda University

2nd round
Yanmar Diesel 5–2 Fukuoka University
Yomiuri 1–2 Toyo Industries
Eidai 2–0 Kyoto Shiko
Yamaha Motors 3–3 (PK 2–3) Nippon Steel
Hitachi 2–0 Chuo University
Yanmar Club 0–2 Furukawa Electric
Fujita Industries 3–0 Toyota Motors
Waseda University 0–1 Mitsubishi Motors

Quarterfinals
Yanmar Diesel 2–1 Toyo Industries
Eidai 0–1 Nippon Steel
Hitachi 2–3 Furukawa Electric
Fujita Industries 2–0 Mitsubishi Motors

Semifinals
Yanmar Diesel 1–0 Nippon Steel
Furukawa Electric 4–0 Fujita Industries

Final

Yanmar Diesel 1–4 Furukawa Electric
Furukawa Electric won the championship.

References
 NHK

Emperor's Cup
Emperor's Cup
1977 in Japanese football